André Roy (born February 27, 1944) is a Canadian poet and arts critic from Quebec. He won the Governor General's Award for French-language poetry in 1985 for Action writing and was a shortlisted nominee for the award on three other occasions.

He has also published extensively as a film and literary critic, and was an editor of the cultural magazines Hobo-Québec and Spirale. An archive of his papers is held by the Bibliothèque et Archives nationales du Québec. Several of his works have been translated into English by Daniel Sloate.

He was one of Quebec's earliest openly gay writers. In 2021 he was named the winner of the Blue Metropolis Violet Prize, a lifetime achievement award for LGBTQ Canadian writers.

Awards and nominations
1979 Governor General's Awards - Nominee in French poetry for Les passions du samedi
1984 Governor General's Awards - Nominee in French poetry Les sept jours de la jouissance
1985 Governor General's Awards - Winner in French poetry for Action writing
1987 Grand Prix du Festival international de la poésie - L'Accélérateur d'intensité
1998 Prix de poésie Terrasses Saint-Sulpice - Vies
2008 Prix littéraire de Radio-Canada
2009 Governor General's Awards - Nominee in French poetry for Les espions de Dieu

Works

References

External links
André Roy

1944 births
Living people
Academics from Montreal
Canadian male poets
Canadian LGBT journalists
Canadian LGBT poets
Canadian gay writers
Governor General's Award-winning poets
Journalists from Montreal
Writers from Montreal
Canadian literary critics
Canadian film critics
Canadian magazine editors
Canadian poets in French
Canadian male non-fiction writers
Prix Alain-Grandbois
20th-century Canadian poets
20th-century Canadian male writers
21st-century Canadian male writers
21st-century Canadian poets
21st-century Canadian LGBT people
Gay poets